The Bowery Presents is the East Coast regional partner of AEG Live. It owns and operates multiple venues in New York City, Boston, Philadelphia, New Jersey, New Orleans, Virginia, and Maine. The capacities of the venues operated by The Bowery Presents range from 250 people to 20,000 people.

History
The business evolution of The Bowery Presents:
 1993 – The Mercury Lounge (250 capacity club), focusing on upcoming artists
 1997 – Bowery Ballroom (600 capacity club or small mid-size venue), headliner-oriented
 2003 – Webster Hall (1400 capacity mid-size club), headliner-oriented
 2006 – Live Nation's New York president Jim Glancy jumps over to become partner and contributes to the company's expansion by doing shows in larger venues with his long-term Live Nation artists and indie rock stars in venues such as Radio City Music Hall and Madison Square Garden
 2007 – Music Hall of Williamsburg, another mid-size club that broadens the company's portfolio of venues creating an "internal" orbit in which they can promote artists at different career-levels and in different neighborhoods.
 2007 – Terminal 5 (3000 capacity mid-size venue) in Midtown Manhattan
 2008 – Wellmont Theatre (2000 capacity mid-sized theatre) in Montclair, NJ
 2010 – Expansion into Boston
 2013 – Wellmont Theatre leaves
 2014  – Webster Hall leaves
 2016  – AEG Live acquire a stake in The Bowery Presents
 2017 – Brooklyn Steel opens, Bowery Ballroom and Mercury Lounge leave
2019 – Webster Hall returns, in operational partnership with BSE Global and AEG Live

Description
The Bowery Presents was founded in 2004 by John Moore, Michael Swier, Michael Winsch, and Brian Swier. In 2006, The Bowery Presents partnered with former LiveNation CEO Jim Glancy, and began to expand to larger venues in New York such as Radio City Music Hall, Beacon Theatre, Central Park SummerStage, and Madison Square Garden.

From 2008, The Bowery Presents began expanding to other regions including New Jersey, Maine,  Boston, Philadelphia.  In 2016 it was reported that AEG Live had acquired a stake in The Bowery Presents,  and in 2017, the company ended its relationship with Michael Swier, Brian Swier, Michael Winsch, and their venues, the Bowery Ballroom and Mercury Lounge. The Bowery Presents is currently operated by Jim Glancy and cofounder John Moore.

Locations

Venues

New York City
Music Hall of Williamsburg - 550 capacity; Brooklyn, NY
Webster Hall - 1,350 capacity; Manhattan, NY
Brooklyn Steel - 1,800 capacity; Brooklyn, NY
Terminal 5 - 2,800 capacity; Manhattan, NY
 Forest Hills Stadium - 13,000 capacity; Queens, NY

Bowery Boston
Bowery Presents moved to Boston, Massachusetts in April 2010 when the company signed a long-term deal with The Royale to be the sole presenter of live music at the nightclub/music venue. Bowery opened a small office in Boston to run the venue and to book events for larger spaces. Since 2010, Bowery has opened The Sinclair and hired the two promoters of TT the Bear's and Great Scott. The promoters work in conjunction with Bowery Presents to bring events to Great Scott and TT the Bear's, as well as The Royale and The Sinclair.
 The Royale is a 1,000 person capacity venue in downtown Boston. It was the company's first space outside of the New York region.
 The Sinclair is a live-music venue and restaurant launched in the winter of 2013 in Cambridge. The live music space accommodates 525 people with plans to host 200 shows annually, while the restaurant will seat 104 and will be open seven days a week. The Sinclair is the first restaurant that the company will work with.
 Great Scott is a venue in Allston, MA with a capacity of about 240 people.

Great Scott closed in 2020 during the pandemic

Other notable venues
 Union Transfer, opened originally in 1889 as the Spring Garden Farmer's Market, is a live music and entertainment venue in Philadelphia, Pennsylvania. After going through several changes over the years, the venue was renovated through a joint venture between R5 Productions, Four Corners Management, and The Bowery Presents in 2011. At capacity, it holds up to about 1100 for standing room.
Franklin Music Hall, formerly known as Electric Factory, in Philadelphia.
 State Theatre is a historic live music venue in downtown Portland, Maine. Opened in the winter of 1929, the theatre has been host to several acts. It reopened in 2010 after an agreement to renovate the property between Alex Crothers from Higher Ground in Burlington, Vermont and The Bowery Presents. At capacity, it holds between 1,450 and 1,610 patrons.

References

External links
 

Music promoters
Music venues in Boston
Music venues in New York City
Music venues completed in 1994
1994 establishments in New York (state)